Brodce is a market town in Mladá Boleslav District in the Central Bohemian Region of the Czech Republic. It has about 1,100 inhabitants.

Geography
It lies in the Jizera Table. Brodce is situated on the left bank of the Jizera River, which forms the western municipal border.

History
The first written mention of Brodce is in a deed of the Vyšehrad Chapter from 1130. It used to be the centre of a small estate. In the 1570s, during the rule of Albrecht Kaplíř of Sulevice, Brodce was promoted to a market town.

Transport
The D10 motorway passes through the municipal territory.

Sights
There are no buildings protected as cultural monuments. The only monument is the remains of a burial mound from the Bronze Age, where archaeological research was carried out in the 1950s.

Gallery

References

External links

Market towns in the Czech Republic